Seth Evans is a scholar and educator who specializes in the Abhidhamma Pitaka (abhidhammapiṭaka) and the Visuddhimagga. He is known for his work in the phenomenological aspects of Buddhist psychology. Evans also plays bass for the punk-rock band The Out of Sorts.

Biography
Evans was born in Denver, Colorado. He started his career as the bass player for the Denver-based punk rock band Reno Divorce and toured America and Europe. After ordaining as a monk, he completed his graduation in Buddhist theory as a Theravada monk at Mahachulalongkornrajavidyalaya University. As a monk, he taught meditation at Wat Prayong where he completed five vassa. His academic focus was primarily on Buddhist ontology, Buddhist metaphysics, and Buddhist epistemology. He completed his PhD in Philosophy from Assumption University of Thailand.

Evans teaches Buddhist philosophy at Mahachulalongkornrajavidyalaya University. He is also chief editor of Journal of International Association of Buddhist Universities.

As a Buddhist scholar, Evans cautions against understanding the teachings of the traditional Buddha of the Pāli Canon with modern scientific concepts such as material cause and effect in terms of karma, neurology in regards to citta, and the scientific method as understood in the 21st century in general. Instead, he urges a hermeneutic interpretation of the  Pāli Canon within the context of the North-Indian culture of 2,500 years ago. In 2018, he joined the Bangkok punk rock band The Out of Sorts as their bass player.

Articles
 Conditions and Appearance: Exploring the Translations of  Rūpa in the Mahānidāna Sutta
 The Buddha's Temperance: A Comparison of Epicureanism and the Dhamma
 Individualism and the Kālāmas: Critiques of American Buddhism

References

Living people
American Buddhists
Expatriate academics in Thailand
American expatriates in Thailand
1977 births